Enter is the debut studio album by American techno group Cybotron, released in 1983. In 1990, it was reissued under the new title Clear. In 2013, it was reissued under the original title, Enter, with additional bonus tracks.

Critical reception
John Bush of AllMusic gave the album 5 stars out of 5, saying: "The collision of [Juan] Atkins' vision for cosmic funk and the arena rock instincts of Rick Davis results in a surprisingly cohesive album, dated for all the right reasons and quite pop-minded." Lee DeVito of Metro Times said, "Enter aims to do a lot of things here, but, thanks to driving drum machine beats, dancing and escapism almost always top the agenda." According to Miles Raymer of Pitchfork, who gave the album an 8.7 out of 10, the album is "widely considered to be where Detroit techno began".

Track listing

Personnel
Credits adapted from liner notes.

 Juan Atkins – electronics, vocals, production
 Richard "3070" Davis – electronics, vocals, production
 John "Jon-5" Housely – guitar

References

External links
 

1983 debut albums
Cybotron albums
Fantasy Records albums